The 1984 North Carolina Tar Heels football team represented the University of North Carolina at Chapel Hill during the 1984 NCAA Division I-A football season. The Tar Heels were led by seventh-year head coach Dick Crum and played their home games at Kenan Memorial Stadium in Chapel Hill, North Carolina. They competed as members of the Atlantic Coast Conference, finishing in third.

Schedule

A.Clemson was under NCAA probation, and was ineligible for the ACC title. Therefore this game did not count in the league standings.

Personnel

Season summary

Navy

at Boston College

Kansas

at Clemson

at Wake Forest

NC State

at Memphis State

Maryland

Georgia Tech

Virginia

at Duke

References

North Carolina
North Carolina Tar Heels football seasons
North Carolina Tar Heels football